Old West Academy, formerly called Majestic Ranch Academy, is a therapeutic boarding school located in Randolph, Utah. Founded in 1986, it detains boys and girls with behavioral issues, ages 7 to 14.

Marketing for the school is (as of May 2018) conducted by the Teen Paths subsidiary of the controversial World Wide Association of Specialty Programs and Schools.

Controversy 
Like other schools marketed by Teen Paths and the World Wide Association of Specialty Programs and Schools (WWASPS or WWASP), there have been numerous allegations of physical and sexual abuse at Old West Academy. In 2002, Old West Academy director Wayne Winder was arrested and charged with Aggravated Sexual Abuse, Child Abuse, and dealing in material harmful to a minor after he allegedly sexually abused students and showed them pornography. A staff member was apparently fired after reporting child abuse at the school to police. Students at the school have limited contact with their parents and the outside world, and all telephone calls are monitored by staff, so it was very difficult for them to report any abuse.

There was very little regulatory oversight of the school, and staff apparently received minimal training to prepare them to handle children with behavioral problems. Even after Wayne Winder's arrest on child sexual abuse charges, he continued working at the school as the director.

In 2005, the mother of a male student at Majestic Ranch Academy filed a lawsuit against the school, claiming that her son was seriously injured after Sean E. Coombs slammed him against a wall and a table, threw him, and struck him. The lawsuit also alleged that the boy was repeatedly restrained and placed in handcuffs during his time at the school.

Students have apparently been forced to stand barefoot on milk crates for long hours, outdoors in sub-freezing temperatures, as a punishment.

References

External links
Majestic Ranch Academy homepage
Old West Academy homepage

Behavior modification
Boarding schools in Utah
Buildings and structures in Rich County, Utah
Private middle schools in Utah
Private elementary schools in Utah
Therapeutic boarding schools in the United States
World Wide Association of Specialty Programs and Schools